Hyalymenus longispinus is a species of broad-headed bug in the family Alydidae. It is found in the Caribbean Sea, North America, and the Caribbean.

References

Articles created by Qbugbot
Insects described in 1870
Alydinae